Isaac Asimov Presents The Great SF Stories 25 (1963) is an American collection of science fiction stories, the last regular volume of the Isaac Asimov Presents The Great SF Stories  series of short story collections, edited by Isaac Asimov and Martin H. Greenberg, which attempts to list the great science fiction stories from the Golden Age of Science Fiction. They date the Golden Age as beginning in 1939 and lasting until 1963. This volume was originally published by DAW books in July 1992.

Stories
 "Fortress Ship" by Fred Saberhagen
 "Not in the Literature" by Christopher Anvil
 "The Totally Rich" by John Brunner
 "No Truce with Kings" by Poul Anderson
 "New Folks' Home" by Clifford D. Simak
 "The Faces Outside" by Bruce McAllister
 "Hot Planet" by Hal Clement
 "The Pain Peddlers" by Robert Silverberg
 "Turn Off the Sky" by Ray Nelson
 "They Don't Make Life Like They Used To" by Alfred Bester
 "Bernie the Faust" by William Tenn
 "A Rose for Ecclesiastes" by Roger Zelazny
 "If There Were No Benny Cemoli" by Philip K. Dick

Notes

External links
 Isaac Asimov Presents the Great SF Stories 25, 1963

25
1992 anthologies
DAW Books books
Martin H. Greenberg anthologies
1963 short stories